Bradysville is an unincorporated community in Adams County, in the U.S. state of Ohio.

History
Bradysville was originally called Bradyville, and under the latter name was laid out in 1839 by Van S. Brady, and named for him. A post office called Bradyville was established in 1846, and remained in operation until 1904.

References

Unincorporated communities in Adams County, Ohio
1839 establishments in Ohio
Populated places established in 1839
Unincorporated communities in Ohio